Charles Edward Crawford, known as ed fROMOHIO, (born January 26, 1964, in Steubenville, Ohio) is best known as the lead singer and guitarist for Firehose, an alternative rock band he formed in 1986 with former Minutemen members Mike Watt (bass guitar) and George Hurley (drums).

Biography
In 1985, Minutemen vocalist and guitarist D. Boon was killed in a van wreck.  In 1986, Ed, a recent Ohio State University graduate and Minutemen fan, heard an erroneous rumor that Watt and Hurley were auditioning new guitarists from a member of Camper Van Beethoven. Ed contacted Watt after obtaining his phone number at a show in Columbus, Ohio. Crawford called Watt and talked his way into visiting with Watt while visiting a friend in Southern California. Watt and Hurley were still very much grief-stricken over the death of their friend and bandmate, and exhibited little interest in starting a new band. While in California, Crawford pestered Watt to meet and play. As Crawford was about to return to Ohio, at the last minute, Watt accepted Ed's offer to jam. Shortly after, Watt offered Crawford a spot in a new band.  Along with Hurley, they formed fIREHOSE. Shortly thereafter, the new band would record their first album, Ragin', Full On,  and started touring. Eventually, he would record four more LPs with the band.

Crawford sang and played guitar with fIREHOSE until they broke up in 1994 after releasing five albums and touring extensively.

Crawford lives in Pittsburgh, Pennsylvania and plays solo acoustic as well as electric gigs around town with his band, the Ed Crawford Trio. He appeared in the 2005 documentary film We Jam Econo. Since Firehose's break-up, he has also fronted the band Grand National (not to be confused with the UK band also named Grand National), and toured as a second guitarist with the now-defunct alt-country band Whiskeytown led by Ryan Adams, as well as with the Chapel Hill band Southern Culture on the Skids, and the Detroit band Mule. In August, 2019, he appeared on the "You Don't Know Mojack" podcast, where he spoke extensively about joining with Watt and Hurely to form fIREHOSE. 

As of 2012, Ed is playing in a band called "Food" which is an acronym for "Far Out Old Dudes".

References

External links 
 FOOD on Bandcamp

American punk rock singers
American punk rock guitarists
Firehose (band) members
Singers from California
Singers from Ohio
Ohio State University alumni
Living people
1964 births
Whiskeytown members
Guitarists from California
Guitarists from Ohio
American male guitarists
20th-century American guitarists